Gianfranco Manfredi (born 26 November 1948) is an Italian singer-songwriter, composer, author, screenwriter, actor and cartoonist.

Life and career 
Born in Senigallia, Manfredi  graduated in History of Philosophy at the University of Milan with a thesis on Jean-Jacques Rousseau.

He debuted as a  singer-songwriter in 1972 with La crisi, an album filled with political and social themes. In 1973 he started working at the Italian Institute of History of Philosophy. Since 1974 he was also active as a songwriter for other artists, including Mia Martini, Mina, PFM, Wess & Dori Ghezzi, Drupi, Heather Parisi, Donatello.

Starting from the early 1980s Manfredi almost completely abandoned the music to focus on writing. He has then published over a dozen novels and short stories, collaborated in various roles to several films, TV-series and plays, and created several comic series. He is also active as a musical critic, and wrote essays on Adriano Celentano, Lucio Battisti, Enzo Jannacci and other Italian music artists.

He lives with his wife Mirella in Italy. His first daughter Diana Manfredi is a film director.

Discography

Album

 1972 – La crisi
 1976 – Ma non è una malattia
 1977 – Zombie di tutto il mondo unitevi
 1978 – Biberon
 1981 – Gianfranco Manfredi
 1985 – Dodici (with Ricky Gianco)
 1993 – In paradiso fa troppo caldo

Novels
Magia rossa, Milano, Feltrinelli, 1983. ; Roma, Gargoyle, 2006. .
Cromantica, Milano, Feltrinelli, 1985. ; Milano, Tropea, 2008. .
Ultimi vampiri, Milano, Feltrinelli, 1987. ; extended version, Roma, Gargoyle, 2009. .
Trainspotter, Milano, Feltrinelli, 1989. .
Il peggio deve venire, Milano, Mondadori, 1992. .
La fuga del cavallo morto, Milano, Anabasi, 1993. .
Una fortuna d'annata, Milano, Tropea, 2000. .
Il piccolo diavolo nero, Milano, Tropea, 2001. .
Nelle tenebre mi apparve Gesù, Milano, Tropea, 2005. .
Ho Freddo, Roma, Gargoyle, 2008. .
Tecniche di resurrezione, Roma, Gargoyle, 2010. .
La freccia verde, Milano, Mondadori, 2013. .

References

External links
 

1948 births
Living people
People from Senigallia
20th-century Italian novelists
20th-century Italian male writers
21st-century Italian novelists
Italian  male singer-songwriters
Italian lyricists
Italian male composers
Italian screenwriters
Italian male screenwriters
Italian dramatists and playwrights
Italian male film actors
Italian cartoonists
University of Milan alumni
20th-century Italian male  singers
20th-century Italian composers
21st-century Italian male writers